Herman M. Holloway Sr. (February 4, 1922 – March 14, 1994) was a state legislator in Delaware. He lived in Wilmington.

Holloway was elected in 1963 to serve the remaining term of Paul Livingston in the Delaware House of Representatives. He went on to serve for 30 years from 1963 - 1994 in the state legislature.

A state health and social services campus is named for him at the Delaware State Hospital site. In 1989 Compton Park was renamed for him. A scholarship to Delaware State University is also named from him.

His son Herman Holloway Jr. also served as a state legislator.

See also
List of first African-American U.S. state legislators

References

20th-century American politicians
20th-century African-American politicians
People from Wilmington, Delaware
Delaware state senators
African-American state legislators in Delaware
1922 births

1994 deaths